"Home Is Such a Lonely Place" is a ballad recorded by American rock band Blink-182 for the group's seventh studio album, California (2016). The song was released as the third and final single from California on April 18, 2017, and the band's last to be released through BMG. Lyrically, the song revolves around the idea of letting go of loved ones. Bassist Mark Hoppus and producer John Feldmann first began developing the song while discussing their families, and how tough it might be when their children grow up and leave home. The song was written by Hoppus, Feldmann, drummer Travis Barker, guitarist Matt Skiba, and songwriter David Hodges.

The song has peaked at number 32 on Billboard Alternative Songs chart. Its music video shows the band members relaxing with family and friends before heading out on tour.

Despite the fact that it was released as a single, the song was not performed live by the band on [[California Tour|''Californias supporting tour]]. However, the band eventually played it on their Kings of the Weekend residency shows in Las Vegas.

Background
Producer John Feldmann recalled that they "needed" a ballad—"whatever that means for Blink"—for California. The concept behind the song, according to bassist Mark Hoppus, is "letting go of people hugely important in your life." He and Feldmann met for coffee one morning before getting into the studio, and the subject of their children came up. They discussed how their lives were built around family, and how difficult it might be for them when their children eventually grow up and leave home. Hoppus wrote the song about his son, Jack, who at the time was 13.

Hoppus was fond of the song's title, calling it his favorite lyric on the album at the time of its release: "I really like that lyric, because when you think about home it's supposed to be safe and comforting and fulfilling, but sometimes it can also be the worst place in the world." He described the song's tone as "kinda in the same mindset" as past Blink singles, such as "I Miss You".

"Home Is Such a Lonely Place" was sent to alternative radio April 18, 2017.

Composition

"Home Is Such a Lonely Place" was written by Hoppus, Feldmann, drummer Travis Barker, guitarist Matt Skiba, and songwriter David Hodges, best known for his work with rock band Evanescence. Feldmann produced the song, and Zakk Cervini served as recording engineer. The song was mixed by Neal Avron. A ballad, the song is largely based around a finger-picked, arpeggiated guitar line, strings, and a snare drum roll. Hoppus sings the verses, with guitarist Matt Skiba singing the chorus and providing background vocals and harmonies. A main lyric in the song is "I hold on tight / But not enough to hold you back."

The song has been described as a folk song, in the same vein as "Boxing Day" from the band’s Dogs Eating Dogs extended play.

Music video
The song's music video was directed by Jason Goldwatch, and released on June 6, 2017. The clip takes the form of home movies, shot on 8mm film, of the trio and their family and friends as they prepare to head out on tour. The description for the video states it was among the most easy music videos to film, as well as most honest and personal.

Personnel

Credits adapted from the album's liner notes.Blink-182Mark Hoppus – vocals, bass guitar
Matt Skiba – vocals, guitars
Travis Barker – drums, percussionProduction'''
John Feldmann – producer
Zakk Cervini – additional production, recording engineer, mixing engineer
Matt Pauling – additional production, recording engineer
Neal Avron – mixing
Ted Jensen – mastering engineer
Allie Snow – assistant
Brian Burnham – assistant
Cody Okonski – assistant

Charts

Release history

References 

2017 singles
2016 songs
Blink-182 songs
Songs about loneliness
Songs written by Mark Hoppus
Songs written by Matt Skiba
Songs written by Travis Barker
Songs written by John Feldmann
Songs written by David Hodges
Song recordings produced by John Feldmann